Christabel Elizabeth Robinson  (28 March 1898 – 3 June 1988) was a New Zealand teacher, vocational guidance and community worker. She was born in Lower Riccarton, Christchurch, New Zealand in 1898.

With a colleague, G. E. Maxwell Keys, Robinson was responsible in 1936 for the establishment of vocational guidance nationally as part of the Ministry of Education rather than the Ministry of Labour, significantly changing its role.

Robinson was instrumental for many years in the New Zealand Crippled Children Society and particularly sheltered workshops for the disabled.

References

1898 births
1988 deaths
New Zealand activists
New Zealand women activists
New Zealand schoolteachers
Nelson College for Girls faculty
People educated at Christchurch Girls' High School
New Zealand Members of the Order of the British Empire
People from Christchurch